The SeaWiFS Bio-optical Archive and Storage System (SeaBASS) is a data archive of in situ oceanographic data used to support satellite remote sensing research of ocean color. SeaBASS is used for developing algorithms for satellite-derived variables (such as chlorophyll-a concentration) and for validating or “ground-truthing” satellite-derived data products.   The acronym begins with “S” for SeaWiFS, because the data repository began in the 1990s around the time of the launch of the SeaWiFS satellite sensor, and the same data archive has been used ever since. Oceanography projects funded by the NASA Earth Science program are required to upload data collected on research campaigns to the SeaBASS data repository to increase the volume of open-access data available to the public.   As of 2021 the data archive contained information from thousands of field campaigns uploaded by over 100 principal investigators.

See also

EOSDIS
Ocean color
Ocean observations
Ocean optics
Water remote sensing

References

External links
NASA SeaBASS Official Website

Earth observation
Environmental data
Environmental science databases
Oceanography